XHUARO-FM is a community radio station in Pátzcuaro, Michoacán, broadcasting on 107.7 FM. XHUARO is owned by Pátzcuaro en Comunidad, A.C.

History
XHUARO received its social community concession in December 2017 and went on the air in June 2018.

References

Radio stations in Michoacán
Community radio stations in Mexico
Radio stations established in 2018